Newspapers currently or formerly published by Community Newspaper Holdings, Inc. (CNHI) include the following, sorted by state:

Alabama 

 The Cullman Times four days per week (previously daily) of Cullman, Alabama
 The News Courier four days per week (previously daily) of Athens, Alabama
 St. Clair News Aegis weekly of Pell City, Alabama

Defunct or merged into other newspapers 

 The North Jefferson News weekly of Gardendale, Alabama; the Cullman Times replaced the News with a page in its Wednesday edition
 The Leeds News weekly of Leeds, Alabama, closed

Florida 

 South Georgia Media Group:
 The Mayo Free Press weekly of Mayo, Florida
 The Jasper News weekly of Jasper, Florida
 Suwannee Democrat weekly of Live Oak, Florida

Georgia 

 Americus Times-Recorder daily of Americus, Georgia
Ellaville SUN of Ellaville, Georgia
 Cordele Dispatch weekly (previously daily) of Cordele, Georgia 
 The Daily Citizen, four times weekly (previously daily) of Dalton, Georgia and its sister papers:
 Dalton Magazine magazine of Dalton, Georgia
 El Informador weekly of Dalton, Georgia
 The Moultrie Observer weekly (previously daily, then three times weekly) of Moultrie, Georgia
 Thomasville Times-Enterprise five times weekly (previously daily) of Thomasville, Georgia
 The Tifton Gazette weekly (previously daily, then three times weekly) of Tifton, Georgia and its sister weekly:
 Tifton Scene weekly of Tifton, Georgia
 The Union-Recorder three times weekly (previously daily) of Milledgeville, Georgia and its sister weekly:
 Lake Oconee Breeze weekly of Milledgeville, Georgia
 The Valdosta Daily Times four times weekly (previously daily) of Valdosta, Georgia

Illinois 

 Commercial-News daily of Danville, Illinois
 Effingham Daily News of Effingham, Illinois

Defunct or merged newspapers 
 Mt. Vernon Register-News - three days per week (previously daily) of Mount Vernon, Illinois, and its sister weekly, McLeansboro Times-Leader weekly of McLeansboro, Illinois, both closed in February 2018
 Shelbyville Daily Union of Shelbyville, Illinois - former daily newspaper that switched to digital-only in May 2020, merged into the Effingham Daily News as of July 2021

Indiana 

 News and Tribune five days per week (previously two separate dailies) of Jeffersonville, Indiana and New Albany, Indiana
 The Goshen News five days per week (previously daily) of Goshen, Indiana
 Greensburg Daily News three days per week (previously five) of Greensburg, Indiana
 Hancock County Image weekly of Greenfield, Indiana
 Hendricks County Flyer weekly of Avon, Indiana
 The Herald Bulletin five days per week (previously daily) of Anderson, Indiana
 Highflyer weekly of Carmel, Indiana
 Kokomo Tribune five days per week (previously daily) of Kokomo, Indiana
 The Lebanon Reporter three days per week (previously five) of Lebanon, Indiana
 Pharos-Tribune five days per week (previously six) of Logansport, Indiana
 Tribune-Star five days per week (previously daily) of Terre Haute, Indiana
 Washington Times-Herald three days per week (previously five) of Washington, Indiana

Defunct or merged newspapers 
 Batesville Herald-Tribune weekly of Batesville, Indiana, closed and merged with the Greensburg Daily News in 2020
 Rushville Republican twice weekly (previously three days) of Rushville, Indiana, closed and merged with the Greensburg Daily News in 2020
 The Zionsville Times Sentinel weekly of Zionsville, Indiana, merged with The Lebanon Reporter in 2020

Iowa 
 Clinton Herald daily of Clinton, Iowa
 The Oskaloosa Herald daily of Oskaloosa, Iowa
 Ottumwa Daily Courier daily of Ottumwa, Iowa

Defunct or merged newspapers
 Daily Iowegian daily of Centerville, Iowa, closed and merged with Ottumwa Daily Courier in May 2020
 Knoxville Journal Express weekly of Knoxville, Iowa, closed and merged with The Oskaloosa Herald in May 2020
 Pella Chronicle weekly of Pella, Iowa, closed and merged with The Oskaloosa Herald in May 2020

Kansas 

 Farm Talk weekly of Parsons, Kansas

Kentucky 

 Commonwealth Journal daily of Somerset, Kentucky
 The Daily Independent five days per week (previously daily) of Ashland, Kentucky
 McCreary County Record weekly of Whitley City, Kentucky
 Richmond Register three days a week (previously six, then five) of Richmond, Kentucky
 Madison County Advertiser weekly of Richmond, Kentucky
 The Sentinel Echo weekly of London, Kentucky
 The Times-Tribune four days a week (previously six) of Corbin, Kentucky

Defunct or merged newspapers 
 Glasgow Daily Times three days a week (previously six) of Glasgow, Kentucky, closed on June 9, 2020
 Grayson Journal Enquirer weekly of Grayson, Kentucky, closed and merged with The Daily Independent in May 2020
 Greenup County News-Times weekly of Greenup, Kentucky, closed and merged with The Daily Independent in May 2020
 Olive Hill Times weekly of Olive Hill, Kentucky, closed and merged with The Daily Independent in May 2020
 Morehead News weekly of Morehead, Kentucky, closed and merged with The Daily Independent in May 2020
 Wayne County Outlook weekly of Monticello, Kentucky, closed May 28, 2020

Maryland 

 Cumberland Times-News daily of Cumberland, Maryland 5 days per week previously daily

Massachusetts 

 The Daily News of Newburyport of Newburyport, Massachusetts
 The Eagle-Tribune daily of North Andover, Massachusetts and its sister weeklies:
 The Andover Townsman weekly of Andover, Massachusetts
 The Haverhill Gazette weekly of Haverhill, Massachusetts
 Gloucester Daily Times of Gloucester, Massachusetts
 The Salem News daily of Salem, Massachusetts

Michigan 

 Traverse City Record-Eagle daily of Traverse City, Michigan and its sister weekly:
North Coast of Traverse City, Michigan

Minnesota 

 The Free Press daily of Mankato, Minnesota and its sister weekly:
 The Land weekly of Mankato, Minnesota

Mississippi 

 The Meridian Star daily of Meridian, Mississippi
 The Newton Record weekly of Newton, Mississippi

Missouri 

 The Joplin Globe daily of Joplin, Missouri

New Hampshire 

 Carriage Towne News weekly of Kingston, New Hampshire
 Derry News-Weekender weekly of Derry, New Hampshire

New York 

 The Daily Star of Oneonta, New York and its sister weekly:
 Cooperstown Crier of Cooperstown, New York

 Lockport Union-Sun & Journal daily of Lockport, New York
 Niagara Gazette daily of Niagara Falls, New York
 Press-Republican daily of Plattsburgh, New York

Defunct or merged newspapers 
 Albion Advertiser weekly of Albion, New York, closed in May 2013
 The Journal-Register daily of Medina, New York, closed in May 2014.
 Tonawanda News daily of North Tonawanda, New York, closed January 31, 2015.

Ohio 

 Star Beacon daily of Ashtabula, Ohio

Oklahoma 

 The Ada News three days a week (previous daily) of Ada, Oklahoma
 The American weekly of Moore, Oklahoma
 Claremore Daily Progress daily of Claremore, Oklahoma
 The Daily Times of Pryor, Oklahoma
 The Duncan Banner daily of Duncan, Oklahoma
 Enid News & Eagle daily of Enid, Oklahoma
 The Express-Star daily of Chickasha, Oklahoma
 McAlester News-Capital daily of McAlester, Oklahoma
 Muskogee Phoenix daily of Muskogee, Oklahoma
 News Press daily of Stillwater, Oklahoma
 The Norman Transcript daily of Norman, Oklahoma
 Pauls Valley Daily Democrat of Pauls Valley, Oklahoma
 Stilwell Democrat Journal weekly of Stilwell, Oklahoma
 Tahlequah Daily Press of Tahlequah, Oklahoma
 Waurika News Democrat weekly of Waurika, Oklahoma
 The Woodward News daily of Woodward, Oklahoma

Defunct or merged newspapers 
 The Edmond Sun daily of Edmond, Oklahoma, closed in May 2020, leaving no archive.
 The Daily Times (Pryor) in Pryor, Oklahoma, closed in April 2017, leaving no archive.

Pennsylvania 

 The Herald daily of Sharon, Pennsylvania and its sister publications:
 Allied News twice weekly of Grove City, Pennsylvania
 Hubbard Press weekly of Hubbard, Ohio
 Mercer County Business Chronicle monthly business magazine
 Life & Times, The magazine with senior flair monthly senior citizens magazine
 View and Voices, a magazine for women monthly women's magazine
 The Daily Item of Sunbury, Pennsylvania
 The Danville News weekly of Danville, Pennsylvania
 The Meadville Tribune daily of Meadville, Pennsylvania
 New Castle News daily of New Castle, Pennsylvania
 The Tribune-Democrat daily of Johnstown, Pennsylvania
 Aldia News the Weekly of Philadelphia, Pennsylvania

Tennessee 

 Crossville Chronicle weekly of Crossville, Tennessee

Texas 

 Athens Daily Review of Athens, Texas
 Cedar Creek Pilot weekly of Gun Barrel City, Texas
 Cleburne Times-Review daily of Cleburne, Texas
 Corsicana Daily Sun of Corsicana, Texas
 Gainesville Daily Register of Gainesville, Texas
 Herald-Banner daily of Greenville, Texas, and associated weeklies:
 The Commerce Journal weekly of Commerce, Texas
 Rockwall County Herald-Banner weekly of Rockwall, Texas
 Royse City Herald-Banner weekly of Royse City, Texas
 The Huntsville Item daily of Huntsville, Texas
 Jacksonville Daily Progress of Jacksonville, Texas
 Mexia News tri-weekly of Mexia, Texas
 The Orange Leader daily of Orange, Texas
 Palestine Herald-Press daily of Palestine, Texas
 The Port Arthur News daily of Port Arthur, Texas
 Weatherford Democrat daily of Weatherford, Texas, and its sister weekly:
 The Parker County Shopper weekly of Weatherford, Texas

Defunct or merged newspapers 
 Mineral Wells Index twice-weekly of Mineral Wells, Texas, closed and merged with the Weatherford Democrat in May 2020

West Virginia 

 The Register-Herald daily of Beckley, West Virginia, and its sister weeklies:
 The Fayette Tribune weekly of Oak Hill, West Virginia
 Montgomery Herald weekly of Montgomery, West Virginia
 Times West Virginian daily of Fairmont, West Virginia
Bluefield Daily Telegraph of Bluefield, West Virginia, and its sister weekly:
 Princeton Times weekly of Princeton, West Virginia

References 

 Community Newspaper Holdings Inc.: Newspapers. 

Community Newspaper Holdings
CNHI